Cytometry Part A is a peer-reviewed scientific journal covering all aspects of the study of cytometry that was established in 1980.  It is the official journal of the International Society for Advancement of Cytometry.

Cytometry Part A focuses on molecular analysis of cellular systems as well as cell-based spectroscopic analyses and associated bioinformatics/computational methodologies.

Brian Mayall  was the journal’s founding editor-in-chief until 1998. Jan Visser  and Charles Goolsby  subsequently succeeded Brian Mayall in this position. Attila Tarnok  has served as the Journal’s editor-in-chief since 2007.

It has been published with  since 2003. Cytometry Part A is associated with Cytometry Part B, .

The journal is abstracted and indexed in:
 BIOSIS Previews
 Current Contents
 MEDLINE/PubMed
 Science Citation Index Expanded
 Scopus

According to the Journal Citation Reports, the journal has a 2020 impact factor of 4.355.

References 

Flow cytometry
Wiley (publisher) academic journals
Publications established in 1980